Within the system of Thelema, the Night of Pan, or N.O.X., is a mystical state that represents the stage of ego-death in the process of spiritual attainment.

The playful and lecherous Pan is the Greek god of nature, lust, and the masculine generative power. The Greek word Pan also translates as All, and so he is “a symbol of the Universal, a personification of Nature; both Pangenetor, "all-begetter," and Panphage, "all-devourer" (Sabazius, 1995). Therefore, Pan is both the giver and the taker of life, and his Night is that time of symbolic death where the adept experiences unification with the All through the ecstatic destruction of the ego-self. In a more general sense, it is the state where one transcends all limitations and experiences oneness with the universe.

The City of the Pyramids

In the A∴A∴ system of attainment, after the adept has achieved the Knowledge and Conversation with their Holy Guardian Angel, they then must cross the great Abyss, where they meet Choronzon, who will tempt them to hold on to their subjective self and become trapped in their realm of illusion. To escape the Abyss, the adept gives up their deepest sense of earthly identity, in the symbolic gesture of pouring out their blood into the Cup of Babalon. The adept then becomes as a Babe in the Womb of Babalon—impregnated by Pan—and their lifeless Self becomes as a pile of dust, taking rest in the City of the Pyramids, which lies under the Night of Pan. This is why it is called Night—it represents the lightless Womb, and also the time before the dawning of the new Sun (or rather, the new Self). They then wait in this sublime state until they are ready to move on to the next stage, and become “born” again from the Great Mother of Babalon, begotten by Pan.

In writings by Crowley

Aleister Crowley identifies this process as one of Love. He explains in his 1938 book Little Essays Toward Truth:

It is also described in the mystical text Liber VII:

Finally, Crowley writes of the Night of Pan in his 1912 or 1913 book The Book of Lies, the first stanza, named "Sabbath of the Goat":

In his commentary on this writing, Crowley explains:

See also
 Ego death
 Great Work
 Works of Aleister Crowley

References

Citations

Works cited
 Crowley, Aleister. (1995). The Book of Lies. York Beach: S. Weiser.

Other sources
Thelemapedia. (2004). Night of Pan. Retrieved April 16, 2006.

Magic words
Pan (god)
Thelema